The 2017 Somerset County Council election took place on 4 May 2017 as part of the 2017 local elections in the United Kingdom. All 55 councillors were elected from 54 electoral divisions which each returned either one or two county councillors by first-past-the-post voting for a four-year term of office.

Results summary

|}

Results by division

Bishops Hull & Taunton West

Blackdown & Neroche

Blackmoor Vale

Brent

Bridgwater East & Bawdrip

Bridgwater North & Central

Bridgwater South

Bridgwater West

Brympton

Burnham on Sea North

Cannington

Castle Cary

Chard North

Chard South

Cheddar

Coker

Comeytrowe & Trull

Crewkerne

Curry Rivel & Langport

Dulverton & Exmoor

Dunster

Frome East

Frome North

Frome West

Derek (full name Derek Tanswell) was elected as a Liberal Democrat in 2013

Glastonbury & Street (2)

Highbridge & Burnham South

Huntspill

Ilminster

King Alfred

Lydeard

Martock

Mendip Central & East

Mendip Hills

Mendip South

Mendip West

Minehead

Monkton & North Curry

North Petherton

Rowbarton & Staplegrove

Shepton Mallet

Somerton

South Petherton & Islemoor

Taunton East

Taunton North

Taunton South

Upper Tone

Watchet & Stogursey

Wellington

Wells

Wincanton & Bruton

Yeovil Central

Yeovil East

Yeovil South

Yeovil West

By-elections

Comeytrowe & Trull

References

2017
2017 English local elections
2010s in Somerset